King Cobra was a water slide at Six Flags Hurricane Harbor New Jersey and Aquapolis Athens at Greece, adjacent to Six Flags Great Adventure, in Jackson, New Jersey. The ride is manufactured by Turkish manufacturer, Polin. The ride did not open for the 2018 season, and was dismantled at the end of the season, paving way for Calypso Springs.

History

American Coaster Enthusiasts announced on February 10, 2012, that Six Flags Great Adventure's Hurricane Harbor had a big announcement for the 2012 season on February 13. On the morning of February 13, 2012, Six Flags Hurricane Harbor: New Jersey announced King Cobra for the 2012 season. King Cobra is marketed as the first ride of its kind in the United States, when the water ride opened on July 24, 2012. King Cobra was built instead of the drop boxes originally proposed to be added to the park's existing water slides at The Falls. It closed in 2017, and was removed in 2018.

Ride
King Cobra features two dueling slides. The drop is the entry point into a Sidewinder element that looks like a cobra head. Within this element riders oscillate back and forth before coming to a stop in the middle. King Cobra has an orange bold, black and red scales to resemble a massive cobra on both the interior and exterior of the slide. The slide was built in the middle of Hurricane Harbor and took place of the existing, sandy volleyball pit.

Incidents
In August 2015 a woman was injured while riding because she had exceeded the 200 pound weight limit for single riders thus slamming into the mouth of the snake. The victim then sued Six Flags Hurricane Harbor for $3 million as a victim of corporate negligence  in 2016. Due to the lawsuit, the Hurricane Harbor management has decided to remove King Cobra in order to make room for a new attraction in the future.

See also
 2012 in amusement parks

References

External links
 Official website
 King Cobra's Statistics

Six Flags Great Adventure
Six Flags attractions
Amusement rides introduced in 2012
Water rides
Water rides manufactured by Polin